The 2012–13 Serie D was the sixty-fifth edition of the top level Italian non-professional football championship. It represented the fifth tier in the Italian football league system.

It consisted of 162 teams divided into nine 18-team divisions.

Promotions
The nine division winners are automatically promoted to Lega Pro Seconda Divisione 2013–14.

Playoffs
Teams placed second through fifth in each division enter a playoff tournament, after the regular season, where the nine winners will compete among themselves with the best semifinalist and the finalist of Coppa Italia Serie D to determine three of the four semi-finalists. The fourth is the winner of Coppa Italia Serie D.

Relegations Playout
 In the groups A-D-E-F-G-H-I of 18 teams the two last-placed teams (17th and 18th) with the 16th, if the 13th place is more of 8 points ahead of it and the 15th, if the 14th place is more of 8 points ahead of this, are relegated directly. Otherwise the teams ranked 13th to 16th play a two-legged playout (13th vs 16th, and 14th vs 15th).
 In the groups B-C of 20 teams the two last-placed teams (19th and 20th) with the 18th, if the 15th place is more of 8 points ahead of it and the 17th, if the 16th place is more of 8 points ahead of this, are relegated directly. Otherwise the teams ranked 15th to 18th play a two-legged playout (15th vs 18th, and 16th vs 17th).

Tie-Breakers
If the two teams finish in an aggregate tie for to decide who is promoted and relegated, in neutral ground will be played one tie breaker, with possible extra time and penalties.

Scudetto Dilettanti
The nine division winners enter a tournament to determine the over-all Serie D champion and is awarded the Scudetto Dilettanti.

Events

Start of season
Given a normal season where there are no team failures and special promotions, Serie D would feature 9 teams that had been relegated from Lega Pro Seconda Divisione, 36 teams that had been promoted from Eccellenza, and 123 teams that had played in Serie D the year before.

Due to eight bankruptcies and exclusions, the 2012–13 season is to feature 6 teams that played in the 2011-12 Lega Pro Seconda Divisione season, 37 teams that played in the 2011-12 Eccellenza season and 119 teams that played in 2011–12 Serie D.

The league also admitted three of the teams that were excluded from the professional leagues. Real Spal (Girone D), formerly SPAL, Foggia (Girone H) and Taranto (Girone H) which all played in the 2011-12 Lega Pro Prima Divisione season. The league further admitted three teams from Eccellenza to fill the vacancies created. These teams are:

 Darfo Boario which finished 15th in Serie D 2011–12 Girone B
 Cynthia which finished 16th in Serie D 2011–12 Girone G
 Fortis Juventus which finished 2nd in Eccellenza Tuscany Girone B and was eliminated in the national play-off

Standings

Girone A

Teams 
Teams from Aosta Valley, Piedmont, Liguria & Lombardy

League table

Girone B

Teams 
Teams from Lombardy & Trentino-Alto Adige/Südtirol

League table

Girone C

Teams 
Teams from Friuli-Venezia Giulia & Veneto

League table

Girone D

Teams 
Teams from Emilia-Romagna & Tuscany

League table

Girone E

Teams 
Teams from Tuscany, Umbria & Lazio

League table

Girone F

Teams 
Teams from Abruzzo, Lazio, Marche & Molise

League table

Girone G

Teams 
Teams from Campania, Lazio & Sardinia

League table

Girone H

Teams 
Teams from Apulia, Basilicata & Campania

League table

Girone I

Teams 
Teams from Calabria, Campania & Sicily

League table

Divisions

Champions of winter and Promotions

All teams promoted to Lega Pro Seconda Divisione 2013–14.

Scudetto Dilettanti

First round
division winners placed into 3 groups of 3
group winners and best second-placed team qualify for semi-finals

Group 1

Group 2

Group 3

Semi-finals
One leg played on May 23, 2013 on the neutral ground at Piancastagnaio, Stadio Comunale. If the games ending in a tie are extended to the penalty kicks without play extra time.

Final
One leg final will be played on May 25, 2013 on the neutral ground at Piancastagnaio, Stadio Comunale. If the games ending in a tie are extended to the penalty kicks without play extra time.

Winner: Ischia

Promotion playoffs

Promotion playoffs involved a total of 39 teams; four from each of the nine Serie D divisions (teams placed from 2nd through to 5th) with the best semifinalist, the finalist and the winner of Coppa Italia Serie D that are directly respectively admitted to the third, fourth round and the Semi-final.

Rules

First and second round 
 The first two rounds were one-legged matches played in the home field of the best-placed team.
 The games ending in ties were extended to extra time. The higher classified team was declared the winner if the game was still tied after extra time. Penalty kicks were not taken.
 Round one matched 2nd & 5th-placed teams and 3rd & 4th-placed teams within each division.
 The two winners from each division played each other in the second round.

Third and fourth round 
 The nine winners – one each from the nine Serie D divisions – were qualified with Arezzo, as the worst ranked semifinalist of Coppa Italia Serie D to the third round, that was played in one-legged match in the home field of the best-placed team. 
 The five winners were qualified with Virtus Castelfranco, as the best ranked semifinalist of Coppa Italia Serie D to the fourth round, that was played in one-legged match in the home field of the best-placed team.
 The games ending in ties were extended to the penalty kicks, without play extra time.

Semi-finals and final 
 The three 4th-round winners were qualified for the semifinal round, join with Torre Neapolis, as Coppa Italia Serie D winner.
 The semi-finals and the final, with the respective winners, were in a one-legged hosted in a neutral ground.
 The games ending in ties were extended to the penalty kicks, without play extra time.

Repechages 
 The tournament results provided a list, starting with the winner, by which vacancies could be filled in Lega Pro Seconda Divisione.
 If the winner is not admitted in this league gets 30.000 €, the finalist instead 15.000 €.

First round
Played on May 12, 2013
Single-legged matches played at best placed club home field: 2nd-placed team plays home 5th-placed team, 3rd-placed team plays home 4th placed team
Games ending in a tie are extended to extra time, if still tied, the higher-classified team wins

Second round
Played on May 15, 2013 
Single-legged matches played at best placed club home field
Games ending in a tie are extended to extra time, if still tied, the higher-classified team wins

Third round
Played on May 19, 2013 
Single-legged matches played at best placed club home field
Games ending in a tie are extended to the penalty kicks without play extra time
Arezzo qualified directly as the worst ranked semifinalist of Coppa Italia Serie D

Fourth round
Played on May 26, 2013 
Single-legged matches will be played On neutral ground
Games ending in a tie are extended to the penalty kicks without play extra time
Virtus Castelfranco qualified directly as the best ranked semifinalist of Coppa Italia Serie D

Semi-finals
Played on June 2, 2013 
On neutral ground
Games ending in a tie are extended to the penalty kicks without play extra time
Torre Neapolis qualified directly as the winner of Coppa Italia Serie D

Final
Played on June 9, 2013
On neutral ground

Relegation playoffs
Played on May 19 & May 26, 2013
In case of aggregate tie score, higher classified team that plays the 2nd match in home wins, without extra time being played
Team highlighted in green is saved, other is relegated to Eccellenza

Footnotes

Serie D seasons
5